Chiasmocleis bicegoi, the Cecilia humming frog or Santa Cecilia humming frog, is a frog in the family Microhylidae.  It is endemic to Brazil.  Scientists have only collected it with certainty from its type locality, but they believe it to be more widespread.

Scientists used to consider this frog part of Chiasmocleis albopunctata, but it was placed in its own taxon in 2018.

References

bicegoi
Amphibians of South America
Amphibians described in 1920